Bilo jednom u Hrvatskoj (Once upon a time in Croatia) is an album by Croatian singer Marko Perković Thompson. It was released on December 8, 2006.

All songs on the album were written by Marko Perković, with the exceptions of Lipa Kaja written by Zdenko Hršak and Tamo gdje su moji korijeni written by both  M.P. Thompson and Fayo.

In 2007, 45,000 copies of the album were sold, making it Croatia Records' best-selling album of the year.

Songs

The album may be considered an historic, or mythical, rock opera about Croatia. It begins with "Početak", which starts with the opening lines from the Gospel of John and continues with God's creation of the world and humanity's actions in it. It then continues with "Dolazak Hrvata" (describing the arrival of the Croats), which deals with how the Croatian people came to their land. The third song, "Duh ratnika", is a dramatic dialogue between Marko Perković (Thompson) and the ghost of a Croatian warrior. The warrior does not recognize Croatia as the land for which he died, and the song is a call to make sovereign Croatia a nation of which to be proud. It continues with "Diva Grabovčeva", a song about a legendary Croatian maiden from Rama, Bosnia and Herzegovina who refused to marry a Turkish bey during the region's Ottoman occupation and was killed. This is followed by "Moj dida i ja", a tribute to Perković's grandfather. The first side of the album ends with "Neko ni'ko ne dira u moj mali dio svemira", a reply to the accusations about the band's alleged sympathies with neo-fascism.

Side two begins with a patriotic love song popular as a single, "Lipa Kaja". The next song, "Kletva kralja Zvonimira", is about another Croatian legend. When the Croats betrayed King Dmitar Zvonimir and killed him, he cursed them so that they would never again have a ruler from their own blood. This curse was supposedly broken with Croatian independence in 1991, but corrupt politicians are betraying the country. The next song, "Ratnici svjetla", is full of pride and hope. It explores a fallen soldier's memory, asking everyone to keep it alive and ending with their brothers in arms, families and the people banding together again with candles in their hands as "soldiers of light".

Tracks

References

Thompson (band) albums
2006 albums